Arpa Darrehsi (also Romanized as Ārpā Darrehsī) is a village in Leylan-e Shomali Rural District, Leylan District, Malekan County, East Azerbaijan Province, Iran. At the 2006 census, its population was 394, in 72 families.

References 

Populated places in Malekan County